George Hays House is a historic home located in Jerusalem,  Yates County, New York, United States. It is a Gothic Revival style structure built about 1872.

It was listed on the National Register of Historic Places in 1994.

References

Houses on the National Register of Historic Places in New York (state)
Gothic Revival architecture in New York (state)
Houses completed in 1872
Houses in Yates County, New York
National Register of Historic Places in Yates County, New York